Waterwheel Falls is a waterfall in the Sierra Nevada of California, located in Yosemite National Park. It is the largest of the many waterfalls of the Tuolumne River. Its upper part contains a series of small ledges, each of which creates a small plume as the water is deflected away from the rock face. A regular phenomenon appears at the first and largest of these ledges during the high-water season of early summer. Strong gusts of wind can lift part of the spray and blow it back upward, causing it to reenter the falls above the ledge. This cyclic "waterwheel" gives the falls their name.

References

External links
 NPS.gov: "Day Hikes in Tuolumne Meadows" 

Waterfalls of Yosemite National Park
Cascade waterfalls
Tuolumne River
Landforms of Tuolumne County, California